Aq Kand (also Romanized as Āq Kand and Aqkand; also known as Agh Kand Mehraban) is a village in Shirin Su Rural District, Shirin Su District, Kabudarahang County, Hamadan Province, Iran. At the 2006 census, its population was 1,286, in 253 families.

References 

Populated places in Kabudarahang County